Sergio Mendes Fedee (born 13 January 1983) is a Saint Lucian cricketer who has played for the Windward Islands in West Indian domestic cricket. He plays as a left-handed middle-order batsman.

Fedee was born in Unity Village, Guyana, to a Guyanese father and a Saint Lucian mother, and moved to Saint Lucia as a child. He was named after the Brazilian musician Sérgio Mendes. Fedee made his senior debut in West Indian domestic cricket at the 2001–02 Red Stripe Bowl, representing the Northern Windward Islands team that was competing on a once-off basis. His first-class debut came in February 2004, when he played for the full Windwards team in a Carib Beer Cup game against West Indies B. In 2006 and 2008, Fedee represented the Saint Lucian national team in the Stanford 20/20 tournament. He had little success, however, with his highest score being 17 runs from 28 balls against the Cayman Islands. Fedee's most recent match for the Windwards came in the 2011–12 Regional Four Day Competition, against Barbados.

Since the end of his professional sporting career he has moved to London, United Kingdom and set up several successful companies specialising in Caribbean tourism. Firstly The Travel Group, a sports and leisure company offering sports tours to some of the United Kingdoms leading boarding schools. Secondly Caribbean Elective, a company offering university students the opportunity to travel to the Caribbean in order to complete a work experience placement in their field of interest. Sergio founded Caribbean Elective in partnership with his business partner Harry Spear. Together they have grown the business which now operates across several Caribbean Islands including Barbados, Saint Lucia, Grenada and Antigua. Sergio and Harry are considered largely responsible for the growth of the youth tourism sector in the Caribbean, and since the success of Caribbean Elective together they have gone on to found True Caribbean Holidays a company focused on giving its customers authentic Caribbean experiences on their holidays.

References

External links
Player profile and statistics at CricketArchive
Player profile and statistics at ESPNcricinfo

1996 births
Living people
Guyanese cricketers
Guyanese emigrants to Saint Lucia
Guyanese people of Saint Lucian descent
Saint Lucian cricketers
Windward Islands cricketers